Paul Mojzes (born 10 November 1936) is an academic who is professor emeritus of Religious Studies at Rosemont College.

Education and career

Mojzes was born in Osijek and grew up in Novi Sad, Yugoslavia. Upon graduation from the gymnasium in Novi Sad, he studied at the University of Belgrade Faculty of Law before coming to the United States in 1957. He received his B.A. from Florida Southern College in 1959 and doctorate in Eastern European Church History from Boston University in 1965. As well as teaching, Mojzes was also chair of the Religious Studies and Humanities Department at Rosemont College.

He was the co-editor of the Journal of Ecumenical Studies, and founder and co-editor of Occasional Papers on Religion in Eastern Europe. Additionally, he was the interim director of the Gratz College Holocaust and Genocide Studies doctoral program and continues to teach at Gratz as an adjunct professor. He was also distinguished visiting professor of Holocaust and genocide studies at Richard Stockton College. He is a member of the United Methodist Church.

Books
 Varieties of Christian-Marxist dialogue (Ecumenical Press, 1978). 
 Christian-Marxist dialogue in Eastern Europe (Augsburg Fortress, 1981). 
 Religious Liberty in Eastern Europe and the USSR (East European Monographs, 1992). 
 Yugoslavian Inferno: Ethnoreligious Warfare in the Balkans (Continuum, 1994). 
 Religion and the War in Bosnia (Scholars, 1998).  
 Balkan Genocides: Holocaust and Ethnic Cleansing in the Twentieth Century (Rowman & Littlefield, 2011).

References

Living people
1936 births
20th-century American historians
20th-century American male writers
21st-century American historians
21st-century American male writers
American historians of religion
Boston University alumni
Historians of the Balkans
American United Methodists
Religious studies scholars
Genocide studies scholars
American male non-fiction writers